Arend von Stryk (born 10 February 1970) is a Namibian footballer with SK Windhoek in the Namibia Premier League. He has also played with the Namibia national football team. He played as a centre forward.

References

1979 births
Living people
Namibian men's footballers
Namibia international footballers
Namibia Premier League players
SK Windhoek players

Association football forwards
Place of birth missing (living people)
21st-century Namibian people